Salman Al-Sibyani (born 11 November 1989) is a Saudi Arabian footballer who plays as a striker.

External links
 

1989 births
Living people
Saudi Arabian footballers
Association football forwards
Saudi Professional League players
Al-Wehda Club (Mecca) players
Ittihad FC players
Al-Raed FC players
Najran SC players
Place of birth missing (living people)
Saudi First Division League players